JWH-251 (1-pentyl-3-(2-methylphenylacetyl)indole) is a synthetic cannabinoid from the phenylacetylindole family, which acts as a cannabinoid agonist with about five times selectivity for CB1 with a Ki of 29 nM and 146 nM at CB2. Similar to the related 2'-methoxy compound JWH-250, the 2'-chloro compound JWH-203, and the 2'-bromo compound JWH-249, JWH-251 has a phenylacetyl group in place of the naphthoyl ring used in most aminoalkylindole cannabinoid compounds.

In the United States, all CB1 receptor agonists of the 3-phenylacetylindole class such as JWH-251 are Schedule I Controlled Substances.

References 

JWH cannabinoids
Phenylacetylindoles
Designer drugs
CB1 receptor agonists
CB2 receptor agonists